Great Expectations is a 1981 BBC drama serial based on the 1861 novel by Charles Dickens. It was directed by Julian Amyes and adapted by James Andrew Hall.

Plot summary

Cast 
 Gerry Sundquist - Pip
 Joan Hickson - Miss Havisham
 Stratford Johns - Abel Magwitch
 Phillip Joseph - Joe Gargery
 Sarah-Jane Varley - Estella
 Derek Francis - Jaggers
 Colin Jeavons - Mr. Wemmick
 Tim Munro - Herbert Pocket
 Linal Haft - Orlick
 Peter Whitbread - Compeyson
 Christine Absalom - Biddy
 Iain Ormsby-Knox - Bentley Drummle
 John Stratton - Uncle Pumblechook
 Marjorie Yates - Mrs. Joe Gargery
 Patsy Kensit - Young Estella
 Peter Benson - Mr. Wopsle
 Melanie Hughes - Clara Barley
 Colin Mayes - Trabb's boy
 Graham McGrath - Pip (aged 9)
 Paul Davies Prowles - Pip (aged 12)
 Tony Sympson - Aged Parent
 Janet Henfrey - Camilla

References

External links 
 
 

1981 British television series debuts
1981 British television series endings
1980s British drama television series
BBC television dramas
1980s British television miniseries
Television series set in the 19th century
Television shows based on Great Expectations
Television shows set in Kent
English-language television shows